The 22nd Regiment Illinois Volunteer Infantry was an infantry regiment that served in the Union Army during the American Civil War.

Service
The 22nd Illinois Infantry was organized at Belleville, Illinois and mustered into Federal service on June 25, 1861.

The regiment was mustered out on July 7, 1864. Its veterans and recruits were transferred to the 42nd Illinois Volunteer Infantry Regiment.

Total strength and casualties
The regiment suffered 2 officer and 145 enlisted men who were killed in action or who died of their wounds and 2 officers and 101 enlisted men who died of disease, for a total of 250 fatalities.

Commanders
Colonel Henry Dougherty - discharged due to wounds on May 7, 1863.
Lieutenant Colonel Francis Swanwick - mustered out with the regiment.

See also
List of Illinois Civil War Units
Illinois in the American Civil War

Notes

References
The Civil War Archive

Units and formations of the Union Army from Illinois
1861 establishments in Illinois
Military units and formations established in 1861
Military units and formations disestablished in 1864